The Alcohol Health Alliance UK (AHA) is a coalition of more than 50 non-governmental organisations which work together to promote evidence-based policies to reduce the harm caused by alcohol.

Professor Sir Ian Gilmore, a professor of hepatology at the University of Liverpool and the Royal College of Physician's Special Advisor on Alcohol has chaired the Alliance since it was established in November 2007.

Policy 
The AHA promotes policies for reducing the harm caused by alcohol as set out in Health First: An evidence-based alcohol strategy for the UK.

The top policy recommendations to tackle alcohol harm from Health First are:

 A minimum price of at least 50p per unit of alcohol should be introduced for all alcohol sales, together with a mechanism to regularly review and revise this price. 
 At least one third of every alcohol product label should be given over to an evidence-based health warning specified by an independent regulatory body. 
 The sale of alcohol in shops should be restricted to specific times of the day and designated areas. No alcohol promotion should occur outside these areas. 
 The tax on every alcohol product should be proportionate to the volume of alcohol it contains. In order to incentivise the development and sale of lower strength products, the rate of taxation should increase with product strength. 
 Licensing legislation should be comprehensively reviewed. Licensing authorities must be empowered to tackle alcohol-related harm by controlling the total availability of alcohol in their jurisdiction. 
 All alcohol advertising and sponsorship should be prohibited. In the short term, alcohol advertising should only be permitted in newspapers and other adult press. Its content should be limited to factual information about brand, provenance and product strength. 
 An independent body should be established to regulate alcohol promotion, including product and packaging design, in the interests of public health and community safety. 
 The legal limit for blood alcohol concentration for drivers should be reduced to 50 mg/100ml. 
 All health and social care professionals should be trained to routinely provide early identification and brief alcohol advice to their clients. 
 People who need support for alcohol problems should be routinely referred to specialist alcohol services for comprehensive assessment and appropriate treatment.

Members 
The following organisations are members of the Alcohol Health Alliance:

 Academy of Medical Royal Colleges
 Action on Addiction
Action on Sugar
Addiction Professionals
 alcoHELP
 Alcohol Action Ireland
 Alcohol Change UK
 Alcohol Focus Scotland
Association of Directors of Public Health
 Balance North East
 British Association for the Study of the Liver
 British Liver Trust
 British Medical Association
 British Society of Gastroenterology
Cancer Research UK
Centre for Ageing Better
 Centre for Mental Health
Change, Grow, Live
Changing Lives
Doctors in Unite
Druglink
 Faculty of Dental Surgery
 Faculty of Occupational Medicine
 Faculty of Public Health
Foundation for Liver Research
Humankind
 Institute of Alcohol Studies
 Medical Council on Alcohol
Men's Health Forum
 National Addiction Centre
 National Organisation for Foetal Alcohol Syndrome UK
Northern Ireland Alcohol and Drug Alliance
Public Health Action
 Royal College of Anaesthetists
Royal College of Emergency Medicine
 Royal College of General Practitioners
Royal College of Midwives
 Royal College of Nursing
 Royal College of Physicians of Ireland
Royal College of Physicians of Edinburgh
 Royal College of Physicians London
 Royal College of Physicians and Surgeons, Glasgow
 Royal College of Psychiatrists
 Royal College of Surgeons of Edinburgh
 Royal College of Surgeons of England
 Royal Society for Public Health
Scottish Families Affected by Alcohol and Drugs
 SHAAP (Scottish Health Action on Alcohol Problems)
 Society for the Study of Addiction
SPECTRUM Research Consortium
 Spinal Injuries Association
 Turning Point
Violence and Society Research Group
We Are With You
Welsh Association for Gastroenterology and Endoscopy (WAGE)
World Cancer Research Fund
 Yorkshire and Humber Public Health Network

References

External links
 
 

Addiction organisations in the United Kingdom
Organizations established in 2007
Alcohol in the United Kingdom
2007 establishments in the United Kingdom